Fassberg or Faßberg may refer to

 Faßberg – a municipality in the district of Celle, in Lower Saxony, Germany
 RAF Fassberg – a Royal Air Force air base between 1945 and 1957 in the vicinity of Faßberg
 Faßberg Air Base – a German Army air base, successor to RAF Fassberg